Suresh Sathya (born 7 September 1987) is an Indian former athlete. The team consisting of Sathya currently holds the Indian national record in 4 × 100 metres relay.

Sathya won a bronze medal as a member of India's 4 x 100 metres relay team at the 2010 Commonwealth Games, which also set the national record in the final.

At the 2010 Asian Games he finished sixth in the 200 metres and fourth in the 4 × 100 metres relay, but both results were annulled when it was revealed that Sathya had tested positive for nandrolone prior to the games. He was suspended from competition for two years for the anti-doping violation.

References

External links
Suresh Sathya at the IAAF

1987 births
Living people
Indian male sprinters
Athletes (track and field) at the 2010 Asian Games
Athletes (track and field) at the 2010 Commonwealth Games
Commonwealth Games bronze medallists for India
Commonwealth Games medallists in athletics
Doping cases in athletics
Indian sportspeople in doping cases
Asian Games competitors for India
Medallists at the 2010 Commonwealth Games